Allan Gilmour was the 11th President of Wayne State University. He was named Interim President on August 30, 2010, and on January 18, 2011, confirmed President.

The son of a Vermont dairy cow dealer, Gilmour graduated from Exeter (where Jay Rockefeller was his roommate), Harvard University and received an MBA from the University of Michigan.  He worked for Ford Motor Company in several positions. He retired in 1995 as vice chairman and CFO but returned to the position in 2002, and retired again in 2005, having overseen Finance, the General Auditor's office, Human Resources, Corporate Affairs and Corporate Strategy. He also led Ford's financial services sector—Ford Motor Credit and Hertz Corporation.

Personal life
Gilmour came out as gay "just after he first retired in 1995, making him the highest ranking corporate leader in America to come out publicly."

References

American chief financial officers
Ford executives
American LGBT businesspeople
Presidents of Wayne State University
Harvard University alumni
Ross School of Business alumni
Phillips Exeter Academy alumni
Academics from Vermont
Living people
Year of birth missing (living people)
Place of birth missing (living people)